D Ground is the main commercial area in Faisalabad, Punjab, Pakistan.

D ground was conceived in mid-1950s by the then-government of West Pakistan. With immense inflow of the immigrants to Faisalabad from East Punjab, now in India, the residential requirements of city were skyrocketing. The government decided convert the barren land 5 km northeast of the city center into a modern residential area, named Peoples Colony. D Ground was designed to be the central market of this colony.
D Ground is home to many branded stores and shopping malls. It is also known as the hub of the contemporary fashion and cuisine industry in Faisalabad.

During Ramzan, before the Eid ul Fitr; and before the Eid ul Azha, a large but temporary Eid market is set up by local merchants and traders. 

The ground in the middle of the market, the hollow area of letter D of English, is divided in two halves. One half is occupied by the Radio Pakistan Faisalabad Station, whereas the other half is a green area.

References 

Neighborhoods of Faisalabad